Aghazadeh (Kurdish: آقازاده) is a term that entered the colloquialism in Iran and Kurdistan region in the 1990s to describe the children of elite who emerge as the men of means and influence, usually in a way that resembles familial nepotism and corruption. This includes utilization of the positions within the hierarchy to gain inside information and preferential status which results in replication of wealth and power across generations and means "fewer top positions are available to talented people without family connections".

The phenomenon is exemplified with family members of high-ranking officials in Iran such as Hashemi Rafsanjani, Nategh Nouri and Vaez Tabasi. In the Kurdistan Region its children of high-ranking Kurdish government, KDP and PUK officials.

In 2017, Zhen-e Khoob ( meaning good genes), a new term  was coined and became synonymous with Aghazadehs and "the privileges they enjoy".

References 

Persian words and phrases
Class-related slurs
Political terminology of Iran
Corruption in Iran
Nepotism
1990s neologisms